Hreljin is a village in western Croatia, just northeast of Bakar and northwest of Kraljevica, above Bay of Bakar.

Hreljin administratively belongs to the city of Bakar, situated in Primorje-Gorski Kotar County - Primorsko-goranska županija.

The village includes the hamlets of Solnice (center of village), Pod Solnice, Biljin, Raskrizje, Stara cesta, Copovsko, Knezovo, Tursko, Vidasko, Sobolsko, Zastene, Gaj, Maj, Lonja, Glavicina, Dorisko, Placa, Kalac, Dragisino, Hrustica, Popelisce, Princica, Kalvarija, Cerkul, Fister, Melnice and Plase.

History 
Legend claims that a Greek named Herkul founded the village.

In 1228 Hreljin signed the Vinodol act making Hreljin Castle one of nine Vinodol castles.

See also

Desinec
Hrvace

Populated places in Primorje-Gorski Kotar County